Cor Heeren (5 December 1900 – 7 May 1976) was a Dutch cyclist. He competed in two events at the 1924 Summer Olympics.

See also
 List of Dutch Olympic cyclists

References

External links
 

1900 births
1976 deaths
Dutch male cyclists
Olympic cyclists of the Netherlands
Cyclists at the 1924 Summer Olympics
People from Halderberge
Cyclists from North Brabant
20th-century Dutch people